Events from the year 1927 in Taiwan, Empire of Japan.

Incumbents

Central government of Japan
 Prime Minister: Wakatsuki Reijirō, Tanaka Giichi

Taiwan
 Governor-General – Kamiyama Mitsunoshin

Events
Houbi Huang Family Mansion began its construction in 1924 and completed in 1927.
 3 January – The opening of Central Bookstore in Taichū Prefecture.
 10 July – Taiwanese People's Party, founded 1927, was nominally Taiwan's first political party.
 25 August – The 6.8  Tainan earthquake shook southwestern Taiwan, killing 9–30 and injuring 27–100.

Births
 10 June – Lin Yang-kang, President of Judicial Yuan (1987-1994)
 30 October – Ang It-hong, former singer
 23 November – Yang Jih-sung, former forensic scientist

References

 
Years of the 20th century in Taiwan